UFC 90: Silva vs. Côté was a mixed martial arts (MMA) pay-per-view event held by the Ultimate Fighting Championship (UFC) on October 25, 2008, at the Allstate Arena in Rosemont, Illinois.

Background
The main event featured UFC Middleweight Champion Anderson Silva vs. number #1 contender Patrick Côté.  Silva's original opponent was rumored to be Yushin Okami, but the fight was cancelled after Okami suffered a hand injury.

A scheduled bout between Thales Leites and Goran Reljic was scratched from the card due to an injury suffered by Reljic. Drew McFedries was chosen as Reljic's replacement.

Diego Sanchez suffered an injury while preparing for his bout against Thiago Alves and was forced to pull out.  Josh Koscheck stepped in to fight instead.

Melvin Guillard was slated to fight Spencer Fisher, but was replaced by Shannon Gugerty.

Ricardo Almeida was replaced by Dan Miller due to an injury.

Marcus Aurélio replaced injured Gleison Tibau.

Future UFC Heavyweight Champion Junior dos Santos made his UFC debut at this event.

Results

Bonus awards
All fighters were awarded an extra $65,000.
Fight of the Night: Sean Sherk vs. Tyson Griffin
Knockout of the Night: Junior dos Santos
Submission of the Night: Spencer Fisher

See also
 Ultimate Fighting Championship
 List of UFC champions
 List of UFC events
 2008 in UFC

References

External links
UFC 90 Event Site
UFC 90 Fight Card

Ultimate Fighting Championship events
2008 in mixed martial arts
Events in Rosemont, Illinois
2008 in Illinois